Bailou is a town of Lianchi District of Baoding, Hebei, China. , it had 13 villages under its administration:
Xibailou Village
Caizhuang Village
Dongbailou Village
Dongdafuzhuang Village
Xidafuzhuang Village
Houying Village
Chailou Village
Beizhangzhuang Village
Toutai Village
Nanchangbao Village
Taibaoying Village
Lujiasi Village
Yangzhihuiying Village

See also
List of township-level divisions of Hebei

References

Township-level divisions of Hebei
Lianchi District